Gandab (also Romanized as Gandāb) is a village in Javar Rural District, in the Central District of Kuhbanan County, Kerman Province, Iran. At the 2006 census, its population was 43, in 12 families.

References 

Populated places in Kuhbanan County